Paul Norton (born 31 March 1961) is an Australian singer-songwriter and guitarist. He fronted the band Runners before launching a solo career in 1988.

Biography

1980–1987: The Runners

Norton started playing bass in various bands in his teens, which led to the formation of Melbourne band The Runners which were signed to Mushroom Records in 1981. The group released their first single "Sure Fire Thing" in 1982 followed by an album Hitting the Wall and single "Endlessly". The Runners toured constantly throughout the early eighties and went through many line up changes before disbanding in 1985.

Norton spent the next couple of years playing with various bands.

1988–1993: Solo career
In 1988, Norton again signed with Mushroom Records Paul released his first single "Stuck On You" which peaked at number three on the Australian charts and was certified gold in 1989. Norton's debut album, Under a Southern Sky was released in August 1990, which peaked at number 44.

In 1991, Norton commenced work in this second album, Let It Fly, which was released in 1992. The singles were "Lil Red Riding Hood" and "When We Were Young".

1994–2005: Hillbilly Moon
In 1994 Norton met Peter Wells RIP (Rose Tattoo) and  Cletis Carr and together they formed Hillbilly Moon and later that year released the album Hillbilly Moon Volume One with the song "She Left Me" receiving solid airplay on Country Music Television.

2006–present 
In 2006, Norton toured Australia with The Countdown Spectacular, featuring 27 of Australia's top rock acts of the 1970s and 1980s performing to 100,000 people nationwide.

Personal life
Paul is married to Australian performer and actress Wendy Stapleton. They have one daughter, Alexandra, who performs under the name Ally Mac.

Discography

Studio albums

Singles

References

External Links
 
 

1961 births
20th-century Australian male singers
Australian rock singers
Musicians from Melbourne
Living people